Major David Leslie William Sheldrick, MBE (23 November 191913 June 1977) was a Kenyan farmer and park warden, in memory of whom the eponymous David Sheldrick Wildlife Trust (DSWT) was created by his widow, Daphne (later Dame Daphne Sheldrick) in Nairobi.

Early years
David Sheldrick, an only child, came to Kenya as an infant with his parents. His father had served with the British Remounts during World War I, resettled near Nyeri and became a coffee farmer at Mweiga.

World War II
Educated at the Canford School, David Sheldrick returned to Kenya until World War II began in 1939. He served in the King's African Rifles (KAR), seeing active service in Abyssinia and Burma. He was promoted to Major, the youngest officer in the KAR to achieve this rank.

Tsavo 
At the age of 28 in 1948, David Sheldrick became the founder Warden of Tsavo, Kenya's largest National Park. He had to deal with the problem of armed poachers, which he was forced to combat by utilizing staff from the Game Department and National Parks. He studied every facet of the elephants' lifestyle on the preserve, collecting data on their food sources, and, along with his wife, Daphne, rescuing and hand-rearing vulnerable elephants, rhinos and antelopes.

Sheldrick helped to develop the Tsavo's infrastructure. There were no roads or buildings when he first arrived. He paved 1,087 kilometres of tourist all-weather roads, 853 miles of administrative roads and 287 kilometres of anti-poaching tracks. He also oversaw the construction of a concrete causeway across the Galana River.

Legacy
After Sheldrick's untimely death from a heart attack in 1977, aged 57, his widow, Daphne Sheldrick (Dame Daphne Sheldrick), established the David Sheldrick Wildlife Trust (now known as the Sheldrick Wildlife Trust) in his memory. Among other activities the trust runs a Nursery for orphaned elephants and other animals in Nairobi National Park.

The 21 meter-high Sheldrick Falls in Shimba Hills National Reserve were named after, Sheldrick. Sheldrick's reed frog (Hyperolius sheldricki) is named in his honour.

External links
Smithsonian.com
Interpol Working Group on Wildlife Crime
Safari Talk.net

References

1919 births
1977 deaths
British Army personnel of World War II
Kenyan conservationists
British emigrants to Kenya
Members of the Order of the British Empire
People from Nairobi
White Kenyan people
British expatriates in Egypt